Cytopenia is a reduction in the number of mature blood cells. It is common in cancer patients being treated with radiation and/or chemotherapy.

Types 
Anemia – a reduction of the red blood cells in the body.

Leukopenia – a deficiency of white blood cells, or leukocytes

Neutropenia – a type of leukopenia, with a specific deficiency in neutrophils

Thrombocytopenia – a deficiency of platelets

Pancytopenia – when all three types of blood cells; red blood cells, white blood cells, and platelets, are all deficient. This is a life-threatening disorder that is a characteristic of aplastic anemia.

There are also two general types of cytopenia: autoimmune and refractory.

Autoimmune cytopenia – caused by an autoimmune disease when your body produces antibodies to destroy the healthy blood cells.

Refractory cytopenia – caused by bone marrow not producing healthy blood cells, and can be a result of cancer.

Symptoms and signs 
The symptoms of cytopenia vary depending on what type is diagnosed.

The symptoms of anemia include:
 Fatigue
 Weakness
 Shortness of breath
 Poor concentration
 Dizziness or feeling lightheaded
 Cold hands or feet

The symptoms of leukopenia include:
 Frequent infections
 Fever

The symptoms of thrombocytopenia include:
 Easily bleeding or bruising
 Difficulty to stop bleeding
 Internal bleeding

Causes 
Cytopenias are caused by anything that promotes the body into creating antibodies to fight blood cells. This includes, but is not limited to:
 Chemotherapy
 Malignant tumors
 Antacids
 Antibiotics
 Anticonvulsants
 Antimalarials
 Antivirals
 Cardiac drugs
 Diabetes drugs
 Hyperthyroid drugs
 NSAIDs
 Rheumatoid arthritis drugs

Treatment 
The treatments for cytopenia vary depending on the type of cytopenia. The treatment for anemia is rest and a diet consisting of high iron foods. Medication can also be used such as:
 Epoetin alfa – a synthetic erythropoietin that stimulates stem cells to produce red blood cells.
 Darbepoetin alfa – stimulates red blood cells but requires less daily doses and less disruption in activities.

People with thrombocytopenia can be treated by avoiding skin damage such as bruising or breaking of the skin.

Neutropenia patients are advised to avoid contact with people who are ill, monitor closely for signs of infection, and take antibiotics when appropriate.

Growth factors are also another way to treat cytopenia. Growth factors are synthetic versions of substances involved in stimulating red and white blood cell production. These medications include:
 Epoetin alfa
 G-CSF
 GM-CSF

Bone marrow and stem cell transplantation are effective for all types of cytopenias. However, when a compatible donor cannot be found, immunosuppressive therapy is also common. Antilymphocyte globulin (ALG) or antithymocyte globulin (ATG) is mixed with cyclosporine to promote cell growth.

See also
 Polycythemia, the opposite of anemia

References 

Blood disorders